Josef Šebek (born 18 March 1888, date of death unknown) was a tennis player. He competed for Bohemia at the 1912 Summer Olympics.

References

External links
 

1888 births
Year of death missing
Olympic tennis players of Bohemia
Tennis players at the 1912 Summer Olympics
Tennis players from Prague